The 2019 Football Championship of Kharkiv Oblast was won by FC Vovchansk.

League table

 FC Vovchansk played in the 2019–20 Ukrainian Football Amateur League.

References

Football
Kharkiv
Kharkiv